A Connecticut Yankee in King Arthur's Court is an 1889 novel by the American author Mark Twain.

A Connecticut Yankee in King Arthur's Court may also refer to:

A Connecticut Yankee in King Arthur's Court (1921 film), a 1921 silent film adaptation of the novel
A Connecticut Yankee in King Arthur's Court (1949 film), a 1949 musical adaptation of the novel starring Bing Crosby
A Connecticut Yankee in King Arthur's Court (album), derived from the 1949 film
A Connecticut Yankee in King Arthur's Court, a 1989 television movie adaptation of the novel starring Keshia Knight Pulliam

See also
A Connecticut Yankee (disambiguation)